The 2003 Air Force Falcons football team represented the United States Air Force Academy in the 2003 NCAA Division I-A football season. They were a member of the Mountain West Conference. The Falcons were coached by Fisher DeBerry and played their home games at Falcon Stadium. They finished the season 7–5, 3–4 in Mountain West play to finish in a three-way tie for fourth place.

Schedule

Roster
NO NAME, POS                 HT    WT  CL  HOMETOWN
1 Overton Spence, LB        6-2  230  So  Jacksonville, Florida (Jackson)
2 Rich Davis, HB            5-5  150  So  Hamilton, New Jersey (Hamilton West)
3 Matt Ward, HB             5-11 175  So  Fort Lauderdale, Florida (Stranahan)
4 Travis Thurmond, QB       5-10 190  Jr  Jacksonville, Florida (Bolles)
5 Anthony Butler, HB        5-9  200  Jr  Newark, California (Gunn)
6 Chris Sutton, CB      6-0  190  Fr  Longview, Texas (Pine Tree)
7 Nate Allen, CB            5-10 180  Jr  Converse, Texas (Judson)
9 Jason Brown, WR           6-4  210  So  Arvada, Colorado (Arvada West)
10 Joe Schieffer, HB         5-10 185  Sr  Indianola, Iowa (Indianola)
11 Chance Harridge, QB       5-11 190  Sr  Bonaire, Georgia (Houston County)
12 Zach Myhra, QB            5-11 185  Jr  La Crosse, Wisconsin (Logan)
14 Anthony Park, WR          5-11 175  Sr  Las Vegas, Nevada (Las Vegas)
15 Darnell Stephens, HB      6-2  195  Jr  Midwest City, Oklahoma (Midwest City)
16 Adam Fitch, QB            6-0  190  So  Gillette, Wyoming (Campbell County)
17 Adrian Wright, ATH        6-0  200  Sr  West Columbia, South Carolina (Lexington)
18 Joel Kurzdorfer, DB       6-0  190  Jr  Warner Robins, Georgia (Houston County)
19 Jordan Wilkie, CB         5-11 180  Jr  Eagan, Minnesota (Eagan)
20 Dan Shaffer, FB           5-11 230  Jr  Lakewood, Colorado (Green Mountain)
21 Mark Carlson, FS          6-1  200  So  Colorado Springs, Colorado (Santa Fe)
22 Jeff Overstreet, CB       5-10 185  Sr  Killeen, Texas (Ellison)
24 Adam Cole, FB             6-0  225  Jr  Dallas, Texas (Richardson)
25 Andy Braley, FS           6-0  195  So  Valdosta, Georgia (Valdosta)
27 Dennis Poland, SS        6-3  210  So  Pittsburgh, Pennsylvania (Central Catholic)
28 David Conley, CB          5-11 185  Jr  Mesa, Arizona (West Lake)
29 Larry Duncan, FS          5-10 200  Sr  San Diego, California (Mira Mesa)
30 Don Heaton, P             6-3  180  So  Waterloo, Iowa (West)
31 John Taibi, FS            6-2  205  So  Englewood, Colorado (Cherry Creek)
32 Felix Cole, ATH           6-1  210  Sr  Linden, Texas (Linden-Kildare)
33 Kris Holstege, HB         5-10 190  Jr  Caledonia, Michigan (South Christian)
34 Sean Rodgers, SS         5-11 195  Jr  Fuquay Varina, North Carolina (Fuquay Varina)
35 Todd Hadley, CB          5-11 185  So  Fountain Hills, Arizona (Fountain Hills)
36 Tyler Hess, SS           5-11 190  Jr  Canyon Lake, California (Elsinore)
36 Chris Hicks, P            5-10 160  Fr  Calhoun, Georgia (Calhoun)
37 Grant Mallory, SS        5-9  185  Jr  Aurora, Colorado (Smoky Hill)
39 Alex Renshaw, HB          5-11 195  So  Odell, Nebraska
40 Steve Massic, FB          5-11 230  Sr  Fairfax Station, Virginia
42 Monty Coleman, Delaware         6-2  250  Sr  Phoenix, Arizona (Brophy College Prep)
43 Robert Hutsell, FB        6-2  230  So  Portland, Texas (Gregory-Portland)
44 Trevor Hightower, LB      6-0  230  Sr  Plano, Texas (Plano)
45 Kenny Smith, LB           6-3  240  Jr  Kirtland, New Mexico (Kirtland Central)
46 George Moore, FS          5-10 185  So  Coppell, Texas (Coppell)
47 Chikaodi Akalanou, LB     6-0  212  So  Hyrum, Utah (Mountain Crest)
48 John Rudzinski, LB        6-2  230  Jr  Green Bay, Wisconsin (Notre Dame)
49 Cameron Hodge, LB         6-2  225  Jr  Parker, Colorado (Ponderosa)
50 John Peel, C              6-2  260  Jr  San Antonio, Texas (Smithson Valley)
52 Robert Price, LB          6-0  210  So  Phoenix, Arizona (Deer Valley)
53 Ryan Carter, Delaware           6-2  250  Sr  Waterloo, Wisconsin (Edgewood)
56 Jon Wilson, G             6-4  290  So  Tampa, Florida (Hillsborough)
57 Ross Weaver, OT           6-7  265  So  Parker, Colorado (Ponderosa)
58 Marchello Graddy, LB      6-1  235  Sr  Wrightsville, Georgia (Johnson County)
59 Justin Wolcott, Delaware        6-2  215  So  Abilene, Texas (Abilene)
60 Cory Crossetti, G         6-3  275  Sr  Wilmette, Illinois (Loyola Academy)
61 Blane Neufeld, G          6-5  285  Sr  Inman, Kansas (Inman)
63 Brett Huyser, G           6-5  300  Sr  Rock Valley, Iowa (Community)
65 Larry Hufford, C          6-1  280  So  Hamilton, Ohio (Badin)
66 Stephen Maddox, C         6-0  260  Sr  Carrollton, Georgia (Carrollton)
68 Frank Willis, Delaware          6-1  220  So  Navarre, Florida (Navarre)
69 Abe Leigh, OL             6-5  275  Jr  Arvada, Colorado (Arvada West)
70 Brian Jarratt, G          6-5  270  Jr  Three Rivers, Texas (Three Rivers)
71 Jacob Anderson, OT        6-5  280  Jr  West Des Moines, Iowa (Valley)
72 Brett Thornton, OT        6-5  255  So  Springfield, Missouri (Springfield)
73 Carston Stahr, Delaware         6-3  205  So  Lincoln, Nebraska (Lincoln Christian)
74 Howard Turner, C          6-4  230  Sr  Homestead, Florida (South Dade)
75 Jesse Underbakke, G       6-3  290  Sr  Mabel, Minnesota (Mabel Canton)
77 Brett Waller, OT          6-7  285  Sr  Oak Harbor, WA (Oak Harbor)
78 Nelson Mitchell, Delaware       6-1  245  So  Houston, Texas (St. Thomas)
79 Scott Diehl, OT           6-6  285  Sr  Springfield, Missouri (Kickapoo)
80 Erik Anderson, Delaware         6-8  220  So  Eden Prairie, Minnesota (Eden Prairie)
82 Alec Messerall, WR        5-11 190  Jr  Alexandria, Virginia (Northridge)
83 J.P. Waller, WR           6-3  195  Jr  Bryan, Texas (Bryan)
84 Chris Charron, WR         6-2  190  Jr  Grand Island, Nebraska (Northwest)
85 Zach Sasser, K            6-1  180  Jr  Amarillo, Texas (Amarillo)
86 Adam Strecker, TE         6-6  250  Sr  Littleton, Colorado (Kent Denver)
88 Russ Mitscherli, NG       6-2  260  So  Victoria, Texas (Memorial)
89 John Schwartz, TE         6-2  235  Sr  Pratt, Kansas (Pratt)
90 Charles Bueker, Delaware        6-5  265  Sr  Camarillo, California (Adolfo Camarillo)
91 Robert McMenomy, TE       6-4  215  So  Snellville, Georgia (South Gwinnett)
92 David Shaffer, NG         6-2  245  So  Lakewood, California (Green Mountain)
93 Michael Greenaway, K      5-10 175  Jr  Culpeper, Virginia (Culpeper)
95 Nicholas Taylor, NG       6-4  270  Sr  Cincinnati, Ohio (Turpin)
96 Andrew Martin, P          6-4  215  Sr  Lucas, Ohio (Lucas)
97 Joey Ashcroft, K          6-0  210  Sr  Springfield, Missouri (Glendale)
98 Todd Jolly, TE            6-4  250  Sr  Cherokee, Iowa (Washington)
99 Nathan Terrazone, Delaware      6-3  240  Jr  La Crescenta, California (St. Francis)

References

Air Force
Air Force Falcons football seasons
Air Force Falcons football